Neither Man nor Beast is an adventure for the 2nd edition of the Advanced Dungeons & Dragons fantasy role-playing game, published in 1995.

Plot summary
In Neither Man nor Beast, an adventure for the Ravenloft setting, a vicious storm maroons the player characters on a desert island. The party survives and is in possession of most of their gear, but are stranded on a small and inhospitable island. The scenario combines wilderness wandering, temple exploration, internecine fighting, bad magic and heavy deceit.

Publication history
Neither Man nor Beast was published in 1995.

Reception
Trenton Webb reviewed Neither Man nor Beast for Arcane magazine, rating it a 9 out of 10 overall. He considered being stranded on an island that is "quiet - too quiet..." to be "a classic kick off for a classic scenario". He found that "death is a very real option, as really it should be for any poor soul that becomes marooned here in the Demi-Plane of Dread". He found it hard to describe the adventure as "the fun of this scenario relies heavily on intricately linked secrets, which even if alluded too would ruin the game" and that "even the island's name contains clues to its true nature", suggesting that the fun "is in the finding out, though, and the excitement in surviving to tell someone just what it was you found." Ramshaw concluded by saying that "Neither Man Nor Beast is an elegant standalone adventure. It could slot into non-Ravenloft campaigns easily - everyone goes to sea eventually - but it's best for folk who already know the Demi-Plane of Dread. For when the island's secret is revealed they'll know precisely how slim their chances are."

References

Ravenloft adventures
Role-playing game supplements introduced in 1995